The Magnanime class was a class of two 74-gun ships of the line built for France in the late 1770s. They were designed by Jean-Denis Chevillard, and both were constructed at Rochefort Dockyard.

 Magnanime
Builder: Rochefort Dockyard
Ordered: 1778
Begun: October 1778
Launched: 27 August 1779
Completed: December 1779
Fate: Decommissioned in 1792 at Brest, broken up in 1793

 Illustre
Builder: Rochefort Dockyard
Ordered: 1778 or 1779
Begun: August 1779
Launched:  23 February 1781
Completed: March 1781
Fate: Renamed Mucius Scévola in January 1791, shortened to Scévola in February 1791, and cut down (raséed) to a 50-gun "heavy" frigate between August 1793 and February 1794. Wrecked in a storm on 16 December 1796 during the attempted invasion of Ireland.

References

Winfield, Rif and Roberts, Stephen S. (2017) French Warships in the Age of Sail 1626–1786: Design, Construction, Careers and Fates.. Seaforth Publishing, 2017. .
Winfield, Rif and Roberts, Stephen S. (2015) French Warships in the Age of Sail 1786-1861: Design, Construction, Careers and Fates. Seaforth Publishing. .

74-gun ship of the line classes
Ship of the line classes from France
Ship classes of the French Navy